The 2005 Fayetteville mayoral election took place on November 8, 2005 to elect the mayor of Fayetteville, North Carolina. It saw the election Tony Chavonne, who unseated incumbent mayor Marshall Pitts Jr.

Results

References

2005
2005 North Carolina elections
2005 United States mayoral elections